The Spanish Royal Crown may refer to either the heraldic crown, which does not exist physically, or the crown known as the corona tumular, a physical crown used during Spanish royal proclamation ceremonies since the 18th century. It is never worn by the monarch.

The last time the corona tumular was used at a public ceremony was in the Cortes Generales during the swearing-in of King Felipe VI on 19 June 2014 after the abdication of his father, King Juan Carlos I. Since July 2014, the royal crown and sceptre are on permanent public display for the first time ever in the so-called Crown Room at the Royal Palace of Madrid.

History
The last Spanish monarchs being solemnly crowned were Juan I of Castile (1379), Fernando I of Aragon (1414), and Leonor of Navarre (1479). Joan III of Navarre was crowned as late as 1555, although she ruled Navarre beyond the Pyrenees.

After the 17th century, all Spanish monarchs have taken the royal rank by proclamation and acclamation before the Church, and since the 18th century, before the Cortes Generales, although the royal crown has been present in these ceremonies.

The current king, Felipe VI, was proclaimed King of Spain on 19 June 2014, having the following symbols displayed in front of him:
 The commemorative crown (i.e. the corona tumular) bearing the marks of 1775, possibly made for the funeral of Elisabeth Farnese, queen consort of King Felipe V. The crown, made of gold-plated silver and no gems, displays the heraldic symbols of the founding kingdoms of Castile and León, with a turret and lion respectively. It was made by order of King Carlos III in Madrid.
 A sceptre, present of Rudolf II, Holy Roman Emperor, to King Felipe II; made in Vienna in the 16th century.

Jewels of National Heritage and private jewels

The jewels worn by members of the Spanish Royal Family today (headbands, necklaces, decorations, etc.) are strictly private, are not linked to any institution, and are considered the personal property of the corresponding member (be it the King as a private person, or some other relative). In that condition, they were taken with them into exile in 1931 (proclamation of the Second Spanish Republic) and stayed out of Spain until 1975.

Tiaras of the Spanish Royal Family
At present, the Royal Family owns a series of privately owned tiaras:

 Fleur-de-lis Tiara, by Ansorena, 1906, given to Princess Victoria Eugenie of Battenberg on the occasion of her wedding by her husband, Alfonso XIII. It is part of the known as "Joyas de pasar", jewels to be worn only by the Spanish queen, per the will of Queen Victoria Eugenia.
 Mellerio dits Meller Shell Tiara, also known as the diadem of Infanta Isabel, by Mellerio dits Meller, 1867. 
 Queen María Cristina's Pearl and Diamond Loop Tiara, made by Cartier for Maria Christina of Austria, consort of Alfonso XII. 
 Cartier Pearl and Diamond Tiara, by Cartier, 1920, for Queen Victoria Eugenia.
 Prussian Tiara, by Koch, 1913, given by Kaiser Wilhelm II to his daughter, Princess Viktoria Luise, on the occasion of her marriage. Inherited by Queen Sofía. Worn by Queen Sofía and Queen Letizia on their wedding days.
 Floral Tiara, by J.P. Collins, 1879, originally giften to Maria Christina of Austria, sold after her death in 1929. Bought by the Spanish Government and given to Queen Sofía on the occasion of her wedding in 1962. It was worn by the Infanta Cristina on her wedding day in 1997.
Ansorena Princess Tiara, by Ansorena, 2010, fleur-de-lis diadem with pearls, a gift from Ansorena to Princess Letizia. Although at first the tiara was believed to be a gift from Prince Felipe to his wife, it was the jeweler itself that in 2010, confirmed in an article in Hello! that the gift came from themselves.

Gallery

References

External links

Webpage about the crown (in Spanish) from the website of Patrimonio Nacional. 

Individual crowns
Spanish monarchy
National symbols of Spain